In ancient Roman religion, a votum, plural vota, is a vow or promise made to a deity. The word comes from the past participle of the Latin verb voveo, vovere, "vow, promise". As the result of this verbal action, a votum is also that which fulfills a vow, that is, the thing promised, such as offerings, a statue, or even a temple building. The votum is thus an aspect of the contractual nature of Roman religion, a bargaining expressed by do ut des, "I give that you might give."

Private vota

In everyday life, individuals might make votive offerings to a deity for private concerns. Vota privata are attested in abundance by inscriptions, particularly for the later Imperial era. These are regularly marked with the letters V.S.L.M., votum solvit libens merito, noting that the person making the dedication "He has fulfilled his vow, willingly, as it should." William Warde Fowler found in these offerings "expressions of … religious feeling" and a gratitude for blessings received that go deeper than contractual formalism.

Military vota
During the Republican era, the votum was a regular part of ceremonies conducted at the Capitoline by a general holding imperium before deploying. The triumph with its dedication of spoils and animal sacrifices at the Capitol was in part a fulfillment of such a vow. A general who faced an uncertain outcome in battle might make a votum in the field promising to build a temple out of gratitude for divine aid in a victory. In 311 BC, Junius Bubulcus became the first plebeian general to vow and oversee the building of a temple; he honored the goddess Salus, "Salvation". A vow would also be made in connection with the ritual of evocatio, negotiations with the enemy's tutelary deity to offer superior cult. An extreme form of votum was the devotio, the ritual by which a general sacrificed himself in battle and asked the chthonic deities to take the enemy as offerings along with him.

Public vota
In the Republic, vota pro salute rei publicae ("vows for the security of the republic") were offered at the beginning of the year, on the day the consuls took office.

Under the Empire, the people assembled on January 3 to offer collective vows for the salus ("health, safety, wellbeing") of the emperor. Offerings were made to Jupiter, Juno, Salus, and sometimes other deities. These vows originated in 30 BC, when the senate decreed vota on behalf of Octavian (later Augustus) as princeps. The vota for the state continued on January 1, while those on behalf of the emperor and his family became fixed on January 3. In Rome, these ceremonies were conducted by the consuls and pontiffs, and in the provinces probably by governors and local priests and officials.

Vota publica continued even after Christianity had become the official religion of the Empire, and possibly as late as the 6th century. Because the vows were as much affirmations of political loyalty as religious expressions, they were difficult to abolish without undermining the sacral aura of the emperor's authority.

See also
 Ex-voto

References

Ancient Roman religion
Latin religious words and phrases